American singer Christina Aguilera has released five video albums and been featured in thirty-three music videos, five films, thirteen television programs, and seven commercials. Aguilera achieved early fame in 1993 and 1994 when she appeared in the Disney Channel television series The New Mickey Mouse Club, which co-starred her contemporaries Britney Spears, Justin Timberlake, and Ryan Gosling. In 1999, she rose to prominence with her eponymous debut album, whose singles "Genie in a Bottle", "What a Girl Wants", "I Turn to You" and "Come On Over Baby (All I Want Is You)" all received their music videos. The videos for the Spanish versions of the four singles were subsequently released in conjunction with the promotion of Aguilera's 2000 Spanish album Mi Reflejo. In 2001, Aguilera appeared in the music video for "Lady Marmalade", a collaboration with Mýa, Lil' Kim, and Pink, which earned two MTV Video Music Awards for Video of the Year and Best Video from a Film at the 2001 ceremony.

Aguilera generated much attention in mid-2002 following the release of the music video for "Dirrty"–her fourth studio album Strippeds lead single, which was found controversial owing to the depiction of overtly sexual activities. However, she later received praise in late 2002 for the visual for Stripped'''s second single "Beautiful", which received a GLAAD Media Award for its positive portrayal of gay people and "message about self-respect and empowerment." In 2004, Aguilera made an appearance on Nelly's video "Tilt Ya Head Back", which was noted for her imitation of Marilyn Monroe. In 2006, Aguilera released her fifth studio album Back to Basics; three music videos for the singles "Ain't No Other Man", "Hurt" and "Candyman" from the album were shot. The lead single's video was directed by Bryan Barber and was highlighted for portraying Aguilera's then newly established alter ego Baby Jane. Aguilera's 2010 studio album Bionic was promoted by the video releases of "Not Myself Tonight" and "You Lost Me", and her 2012 studio album Lotus received its promotion from the video for "Your Body".

In addition to her music videos, Aguilera has released five video albums. Four DVDs Genie Gets Her Wish, My Reflection, Stripped Live in the U.K., and Back to Basics: Live and Down Under were filmed in accompaniment with Aguilera's concert tours Christina Aguilera in Concert (2000), The Stripped Tour (2003), and Back to Basics Tour (2006–2008). Meanwhile, the other video album Back to Basics and Beyond was released exclusively in North America in 2006 in conjunction with the promotion of the album Back to Basics. Aguilera's first film appearance was in Shark Tale (2004), in which she voiced a Rastafarian jellyfish and for whose soundtrack she recorded a song titled "Car Wash" with Missy Elliott. She subsequently starred in the 2010 film Burlesque as Ali Rose, a dancer in a burlesque club. The film received lukewarm critical reception and garnered over US$90.5 million. She has additionally appeared in several television shows, including the reality television series The Voice'', of which six out of ten seasons saw her contribution as a coach and judge.

Music videos

1990s and 2000s

2010s

2020s

Video albums

Film

Television

Commercials

Notes

References

Bibliography

External links
Christina Aguilera's official Vevo channel on YouTube
Christina Aguilera at AllMovie
Christina Aguilera at Rotten Tomatoes

Videography
Videographies of American artists
Actress filmographies
American filmographies